The Ankleshwar–Rajpipla section belongs to  division of Western Railway zone in Gujarat State.

History

Ankleshwar-Raj Pardi branch was opened in 1897. The length of Ankleshwar-Raj Pardi branch was 30 km. Raj Pardi-Umalla branch was opened in 1899. The length of Raj Pardi-Umalla branch was 8 km. Umalla-Amletha and Amletha-Rajpipla branch was opened in 1899 and 1917 respectively.

Foundation stone for Ankleshwar–Rajpipla section Gauge conversion was laid in 2008. The Narrow gauge to Broad gauge conversion of Ankleshwar–Rajpipla section was completed in 2013.

References

5 ft 6 in gauge railways in India
Railway lines in Gujarat